Diamanti is a surname. Notable people with the surname include:

 Alessandro Diamanti (born 1983), Italian footballer
 Brendon Diamanti (born 1981), New Zealand cricketer
 Gersi Diamanti (born 1999), Albanian footballer
 Ilvo Diamanti (born 1952), Italian political scientist
 Litsa Diamanti (born 1949), Greek singer